The 1896 VMI Keydets football team represented the Virginia Military Institute (VMI) in their sixth season of organized football. The Keydets had a 3–4 record, marking the first losing season in program history.

Schedule

References

VMI
VMI Keydets football seasons
VMI Keydets football